This is a list of terrorist incidents which took place in 2014, including attacks by violent non-state actors for political motives. Note that terrorism related to drug wars and cartel violence is not included in these lists. Ongoing military conflicts are listed separately.

List guidelines
 To be included, entries must be notable (have a stand-alone article) and described by a consensus of reliable sources as "terrorism".
 List entries must comply with the guidelines outlined in the manual of style under MOS:TERRORIST.
 Casualty figures in this list are the total casualties of the incident, including immediate casualties and later casualties (such as people who succumbed to their wounds long after the attacks occurred).
The casualties listed are the victims, perpetrator casualties are listed separately (e.g. (+1 perpetrator) indicate that along with the victims of the attack, one perpetrator was also killed/injured).
Casualty totals may be underestimated or unavailable due to a lack of information. A figure with a plus (+) sign indicates that at least that many people have died (e.g. 10+ indicates that at least 10 people have died) – the actual toll could be considerably higher.
If casualty figures are 20 or more, they will be shown in bold. In addition, figures for casualties more than 50 will also be underlined.

List

Total Incidents:

References

 2014
Conflicts in 2014
 
 
Terrorist incidents
 2014